Hydromadinone acetate (developmental code name NSC-33170), also known as chloroacetoxyprogesterone (CAP), as well as 6α-chloro-17α-acetoxyprogesterone or 6α-chloro-17α-acetoxypregn-4-ene-3,20-dione, is a steroidal progestin of the 17α-hydroxyprogesterone group that was never marketed. It is the C17α acetate ester of hydromadinone, which, similarly, was never marketed.

See also
 List of progestogens
 List of progestogen esters

References

Abandoned drugs
Acetate esters
Diketones
Organochlorides
Pregnanes
Progestogen esters
Progestogens